Micawber is a 2001 ITV comedy drama series starring David Jason. It was written by John Sullivan, based upon the character of Wilkins Micawber from Charles Dickens' 1850 novel David Copperfield, although the storylines were original.

Plot
Although not explicitly stated the series is probably a prequel, it depicts Micawber where David Copperfield first meets him in London. The first episode the series expands on the back story of Micawber. He had been a qualified lawyer but was struck off when charged with embezzling his father-in-law's company's accounts. Micawber believes he was drunk while doing the accounts and thus wrote them incorrectly through negligence; however, it is later revealed he was drugged by his father-in-law who deliberately altered the numbers on Micawber's accounts to frame him. The rest of the series follows Micawber attempting a series of different careers. These include working for a newspaper and later as butler until the lady of the house seduces him and he is challenged to a duel by her husband. Micawber escapes this by faking his own death. In a subplot, the Micawbers adopt a now orphaned workhouse girl, Alice, despite struggling to support their own family. However, this virtue is rewarded when a dangerous debt collector realises she is his daughter and consequently takes over Micawber's debts.

Cast
 David Jason as Wilkins Micawber
 Annabelle Apsion as Emma Micawber
 Lucinda Dryzek as Lily Micawber
 Andrew Quigley as Wilkins Micawber Junior
 Michael Troughton as Milton

Production

Development
Sullivan had originally written an adaptation of Dickens' novel which was rejected by the BBC in favour of the 1999 Adrian Hodges adaptation.

Broadcast
It was broadcast in four parts, the first part on Boxing Day 2001 and starred a number of well-known British actors and actresses.

References

External links

ITV television dramas
ITV comedy
Period television series
Television shows based on David Copperfield
2000s British drama television series
2001 British television series debuts
2002 British television series endings
2000s British television miniseries
Television series by ITV Studios
Television series by Yorkshire Television
Films shot in Edinburgh
English-language television shows